Alexei Berestnev (born April 12, 1991) is a Russian professional ice hockey goaltender. He is currently playing with Amur Khabarovsk of the Kontinental Hockey League (KHL).

Berestnev made his Kontinental Hockey League debut playing with Amur Khabarovsk during the 2012–13 season.

References

External links

Living people
1991 births
Amur Khabarovsk players
Russian ice hockey goaltenders